Robbie Stewart is a Grand Prix motorcycle racer from Great Britain.

Career statistics

By season

Races by year

References

External links
  Profile on motogp.com

Scottish motorcycle racers
Living people
Sportspeople from Perth, Scotland
1991 births
125cc World Championship riders